Pak Khlong Phasi Charoen is a khwaeng (sub-district) of Phasi Charoen District, Bangkok's Thonburi side.

Geography
Its name "Pak Khlong Phasi Charoen" meaning "mouth of Phasi Charoen canal", because it is the confluence of khlongs (canal) Phasi Charoen and Bangkok Yai, regarded as the beginning of Khlong Phasi Charoen include the nearby area, also with a Khlong Dan that intersects with Khlong Bangkok Yai as well.

The area is the southeast part of the district, with a total area of 0.50 km2 (0.19 mi2), it is considered the smallest sub-district of the district.

Neighbouring subdistricts are (from the north clockwise): Khuha Sawan and Bang Chak in its district, Wat Tha Phra of Bangkok Yai District, Talat Phlu of Thon Buri District, and Bang Wa in its district.

Thailand Route 4 (Phet Kasem Road) is the main road. Ratchaphruek and Thoet Thai Roads are classified as minor road.

Bang Phai is a popular name used to call this area (shares with Khuha Sawan).

Places

Wat Paknam Bhasicharoen
Wat Nang Chi Chotikaram
Wat Nuannoradit
Wat Absorn Sawan
Wat Nakprok
Wat Thong Sala Ngarm
Wat Kamphaeng Bang Chak
Wat Pradu Bang Chak
Wat Pleang
Phyathai 3 Hospital
Bang Wa BTS Station
Phet Kasem Interchange
 Seni Market
Bangphai General Hospital
Phai Thong Niwet Village
Khlong Bang Luang Floating Market
Bang Phai MRT Station
Bang Phai Bridge

References

Subdistricts of Bangkok
Phasi Charoen district